The Rally Serras de Fafe e Felgueiras (previously known as Rali Serras de Fafe, Rali FC Porto, Rallye às Antas), is a rallying event that takes place annually in Portugal. The rally was held for the first time in 1955 as Rallye às Antas and from 1968 as the Rali às Barragens Norte.

In 2021, the Rally Serras de Fafe e Felgueiras became part of the European Rally Championship. It was going to take place from March 12–14 as the first event of the season, but at the request of the Portuguese Automobile Federation its date was changed to September 23–25. The dates were changed again and it finally took place on October 1–3 as the sixth event of the championship.

The unusually long name for the 2023 event comes from the involvement of the municipalities of Fafe, Felgueiras, Boticas, Vieira do Minho and Cabeceiras de Basto.

Winners 

 POR – Portuguese Rally Championship
 ERC – European Rally Championship

References

External links 

Rally details at eWRC-results

Motorsport in Portugal
European Rally Championship rallies
1955 establishments in Portugal
Recurring sporting events established in 1955